Kudumbam Namukku Sreekovil is a 1978 Indian Malayalam film, directed by Hariharan and produced by T. E. Vasudevan. The film stars Prem Nazir, Adoor Bhasi, Jose Prakash and Sankaradi in the lead roles. The film has musical score by V. Dakshinamoorthy.

Cast
 
Prem Nazir 
Adoor Bhasi 
Jose Prakash
Kaviyoor Ponnamma 
Sankaradi 
Sukumaran
Mallika Sukumaran 
Unnimary 
Janardanan 
K. R. Vijaya 
Meena 
Master Raghu as Raghu

Soundtrack
The music was composed by V. Dakshinamoorthy.

References

External links
 
 kudumbam namukku sreekovil MALAYALAM MOVIE

1978 films
1970s Malayalam-language films
Films directed by Hariharan